2C-T-19 (2,5-dimethoxy-4-butylthiophenethylamine) is a psychedelic phenethylamine of the 2C family.  It was first synthesized by Alexander Shulgin.

Dosage
In his book PiHKAL, Shulgin describes synthesis of the final intermediate of 2C-T-19 but did not bioassay the compound.

Legality

Canada
As of October 31, 2016, 2C-T-19 is a controlled substance (Schedule III) in Canada.

United States
In the United States, 2C-T-19 is not specifically scheduled, but possession and sales of 2C-T-19 could be prosecuted under the Federal Analog Act because of its structural similarities to 2C-T-7.

References

2C (psychedelics)
Thioethers
Butyl compounds